The Burmese narrow-headed softshell turtle (Chitra vandijki), also known commonly as the Myanmar narrow-headed softshell turtle and Van Dijk's chitra, is a species of turtle in the family Trionychidae. The species is endemic to Southeast Asia.

Etymology
The specific name, vandijki, is in honor of Dutch herpetologist Peter Paul van Dijk.

Description
C. vandijki is one of the largest freshwater turtles in the world, with a straight carapace length of at least .

Geographic range and habitat
C. vandijki is found in Myanmar, specifically the Irrawaddy and Chindwin river drainages, and northwestern Thailand. It is possible that it lives in the Sittaung River as well.

Ecology and behavior
Barely anything is known about the ecology of C. vandijki in the wild, other than that it is fully aquatic.

Conservation
The conservation status of C. vandijki has been evaluated as Critically Endangered by the IUCN, and populations are believed to be declining due to overharvesting for southern Chinese food markets. It is believed that establishing a protected area around parts of the Irrawaddy and Chindwin rivers would help this species, but it has not been done yet. People have also struggled to successfully keep C. vandijki in captivity. 

On July 23, 2018, members of the TSA's and WCS's turtle conservation program in Myanmar excavated the nests of female C.vandijki on the banks of the Chindwin River in order to translocate them to a protected hatchery in Linpha Village. The program also incubated eggs from the critically endangered Burmese roofed turtle (Batagur trivittata). 67 individual Burmese narrow-headed softshell turtles from the program hatched on September 30.

References

Bibliography
McCord, William P.; Pritchard, Peter C. H. (2003). "A Review of the Softshell Turtles of the Genus Chitra, with the Description of New Taxa from Myanmar and Indonesia (Java)". Hamadryad 27 (1): 11–56. (Chitra vandijki, new species, pp. 39–41).

Chitra (genus)
Reptiles described in 2003